Junius H. Rose High School (known colloquially as J.H. Rose, Rose High or simply Rose) is a public high school in Greenville, North Carolina, United States. It is part of the Pitt County Schools district.

History 
J.H. Rose High School was established in 1957 on South Elm Street, in Greenville, North Carolina. Students that made up the original student body came from the former Greenville High School in downtown Greenville. Students from the former historically black C. M. Eppes High School were integrated in during the late 1960s and early 1970s. The school moved to its present location on Arlington Boulevard (the former Greenville Middle School) in 1992.

Notable alumni 
 Jamie Brewington, MLB player
 Andre Brown, NFL player
 Derek Cox, former NFL player
 Carlester Crumpler, NFL player
 Brian Farkas, State House Representative in the North Carolina General Assembly representing NC State House District 09
 William Frizzell, NFL player
 Michael Harrington, soccer player
 Whit Haydn, magician
 Kelly Heath, MLB player
 Al Hunter, NFL running back, primarily known as being the first player to enter the NFL through the Supplemental Draft
 Kristi Overton Johnson, former water skiing world champion
 Will MacKenzie, professional golfer who played on the PGA Tour
 Lee Norris, actor
 Petey Pablo, rapper
 Doug Paschal, NFL player
 Tommy Paul, professional tennis player
 Lauren Perdue, competitive swimmer, gold medalist in the 4×200-meter freestyle relay at the 2012 Summer Olympics
 Cornell Powell, NFL player 
 Harold Randolph, CFL player
 Caroline Shaw, violinist, singer, composer
 Tom Smith, musician
 Troy Smith, NFL player
 Kentavius Street, NFL player
 Joe West, MLB umpire
 Jermaine Williams, NFL player
 Jonathan Williams, NFL and CFL player

References

External links 
 

Schools in Pitt County, North Carolina
Public high schools in North Carolina
Educational institutions established in 1957
1957 establishments in North Carolina